The Foveaux shag (Leucocarbo stewarti), together with the Otago shag formerly known as the Stewart Island shag and in its dark phase as the bronze shag, is a species of shag endemic to Stewart Island/Rakiura and Foveaux Strait, from which it takes its name.

Taxonomy 
Until 2016 Foveaux shags were classified with Otago shags (L. chalconotus) in a single species, called the Stewart Island shag. Mitochondrial DNA suggests Otago shags are actually more closely related to Chatham shags (Leucocarbo onslowi), and osteological, morphological, morphometric, behavioural, and genetic differences supported recognising Foveaux shags as a separate species, L. stewarti. Foveaux and Otago shags probably diverged when populations were split up by lower sea levels in the Pleistocene, and the Chatham Islands were colonised by shags from Otago. Other taxonomists have kept the Otago shag and the Foveaux shag conspecific.
 
A recent taxonomic revision argues that Leucocarbo is a distinct genus, which would contain amongst other species the Otago, Foveaux, and Chatham shags.

Description 
The species is dimorphic, with two plumages. Roughly half the individuals are pied, with dark and white feathers, and the rest are dark all over. Both morphs breed together. These large, chunky birds are 68 cm (27 in) long and weigh 1.8–2.9 kg (4–6.4 lbs), slightly smaller than Otago shags.

Foveaux shags can be distinguished from Otago shags by their facial ornamentation in the breeding season: Foveaux shags have dark orange papillae on their face, whereas Otago shags have both papillae and small bright orange facial caruncles above the base of the bill.

Distribution and conservation 
Foveaux shags are restricted to Stewart Island and Foveaux Strait, both at present, historically, and prehistorically (based on museum specimens, archaeological remains, and subfossil bones); rarely, beach-wrecked birds have been found in Otago. They breed colonially from September onwards, making raised cup nests out of organic material and guano on islands and sea cliffs. Colonies are large enough to be strikingly visible, and are used year after year. They feed in coastal waters less than 30 m deep and are rarely if ever seen inland or far out to sea.

There are less than 2500 Foveaux shags remaining. The population seems stable and retains much of its genetic diversity in comparison to the Otago shag, which is continuing to decline. Foveaux shags have fared better than Otago shags because they nest on inaccessible islands just offshore. Nevertheless, their small population size make both species vulnerable to extinction, and conservation efforts will need to be tailored to each species' demographic history, genetic variation, and restricted geographic distribution.

References

External links 
Foveaux shag discussed on RadioNZ Critter of the Week, 4 March 2016

Foveaux shag
Birds of the South Island
Foveaux shag
Foveaux shag
Endemic birds of New Zealand